Katherine Noel Valentine Brosnahan Spade (born Katherine Noel Brosnahan; December 24, 1962 – June 5, 2018) was an American fashion designer, entrepreneur, and fashion icon. She was the co-founder and co-owner of the designer brand Kate Spade New York.

Early life
Spade was born Katherine Noel Brosnahan in Kansas City, Missouri, the daughter of June (Mullen) and Francis (Frank) Brosnahan, who owned a road-construction company. She was of mostly Irish descent. After graduating from St. Teresa's Academy, an all-female Catholic high school, Spade attended the University of Kansas. She later transferred to Arizona State University. She joined the Kappa Kappa Gamma sorority and graduated with a journalism degree in 1985, thinking she would go into television production. While in college, she worked in sales at Carter's Men Shop, a men's clothing store in Phoenix; her co-worker was Andy Spade, who later became her husband and business partner.

Career

Mademoiselle
By 1986, the couple had moved to Manhattan. Kate worked in the accessories department at Mademoiselle. She left Mademoiselle in 1991, achieving the rank of senior fashion editor and head of accessories. While working for Mademoiselle, she had noticed that the market lacked stylish, affordable, and sensible handbags, so decided to create her own.

Kate Spade New York

Kate and Andy founded Kate Spade New York in January 1993. Spade was initially undecided on the brand's name, because Andy and she had not yet married, and "Kate Brosnahan" seemed a cumbersome name for a fashion label. She considered a number of names, but agreed when Andy suggested "Kate Spade", as she would take the name Spade after their marriage.

Spade made six prototypes with Scotch tape and paper, and found a manufacturer in East New York willing to work with a startup to produce the bags. To finance the company, Andy, who had worked as a copywriter, withdrew his 401(k) pension plan and sometimes paid employees with personal checks. The couple spent their shipping season living at friends' apartments, since their own was filled with boxed handbags.

After an early show at the Javits Center at which the department-store chain Barneys ordered a few bags, Spade decided to put the bag's labels on the outside, a change that took her all night to alter, but established the brand.

The bags, priced in the US$150 to $450 range, quickly became popular, particularly in New York. That was "a real shift" in fashion, said Fern Mallis, director of the Council of Fashion Designers of America  during the 1990s. "Everybody had Kate Spade bags. You could afford them, and happily buy more than one."

Young American women at the time also liked the bags' sophisticated look. One woman recalled that the Kate Spade bags looked "mature, without being too adult for a teenager," unlike higher-priced brands such as Burberry or Louis Vuitton. "At the turn of the last century, her bag came to encapsulate a decidedly Manhattan moment in time," a moment when Vogue editor-in-chief Anna Wintour recalled that it was impossible to walk a block in the city without seeing one.

The company exclusively sold handbags at first, but soon expanded to clothing, jewelry, shoes, stationery, eyewear, baby items, fragrances, and gifts. In 1996, the Kate Spade brand opened its first boutique, a  shop in Manhattan's trendy SoHo district, and moved its headquarters into a  space on West 25th Street.

Kate Spade also had two brand extensions called Kate Spade Saturday and Jack Spade. Kate Spade Saturday carried more casual handbags and apparel, but had heavy promotions and eventually closed in 2015. Jack Spade was a menswear line created by Kate Spade that offered men's leather goods and accessories, but that also closed in 2015.

In 1999, Spade sold a 56% stake in her business to Neiman Marcus Group, helping to expand the brand worldwide.

In 2004, "Kate Spade at Home" was launched as a home-collection brand. It featured bedding, bath items, china, wallpaper, table decor, flatware, and various decoration items. A Kate Spade store was opened in Aoyama, Tokyo, Japan.

Spade also published three books on the subjects of etiquette, entertainment, and fashion: Manners, Occasions, and Style, respectively.

By 2006, Spade had sold her remaining 44% of her shares to Neiman Marcus Group. The group sold the label in 2006 to Liz Claiborne Inc., for $124 million; it was later renamed Fifth & Pacific. The company was later purchased by Coach, Inc. in May 2017; both Coach and Kate Spade are now part of Tapestry, Inc.

Frances Valentine
After selling the remaining portion of her ownership in her brand, Spade took several years off to focus on her newborn daughter.

In 2016, she launched a new collection of luxury footwear and handbags under the brand name Frances Valentine. The name stemmed from a hybrid of family names; Frances is a family name on Spade's paternal side. "Valentine" was Spade's maternal grandfather's middle name, having been born on Valentine's Day. Spade later legally added Valentine to her full name.

After Spade's death, the brand released a collection of designs called "Love Katy" in her memory. Spade had several years' worth of designs and inspirations for the brand, and the company plans to launch them.

Personal life 
Spade married Andy Spade, the brother of actor/comedian David Spade, in 1994. While not legally separated, the couple had begun living apart a few months before her death.

The couple's only child, a daughter, was born in 2005.

Actress Rachel Brosnahan is Spade's niece. On April 11, 2002, Spade appeared as herself in an episode of Just Shoot Me!, “Blush Gets Some Therapy”, season six episode nineteen, alongside her brother-in-law David Spade.

Death
A housekeeper found Spade dead in her Manhattan apartment on June 5, 2018. Her death was ruled a suicide by hanging. Police reported that she had left a note, which was addressed to her daughter. The day after his wife's death, Andy Spade released a statement: Kate suffered from depression and anxiety for many years. She was actively seeking help and working closely with doctors to treat her disease, one that takes far too many lives. We were in touch with her the night before and she sounded happy. There was no indication and no warning that she would do this. It was a complete shock. And it clearly wasn't her. There were personal demons she was battling.Following her death, the flagship Kate Spade New York store in Manhattan (and soon other stores nationwide) displayed a sign in its front window reading: Kate Spade, the visionary founder of our brand, has passed. Our thoughts are with her family at this incredibly heartbreaking time. We honor all the beauty she brought into this world.

Awards
In 1996, the Council of Fashion Designers of America awarded Spade "America's New Fashion Talent in Accessories" for her classic designs. In 1998, the organization again honored her for "Best Accessory Designer of the Year".

Her home collection won her three design awards in 2004, including, House Beautiful's "Giants of Design Award for Tastemaker", Bon Appétits "American Food and Entertaining Award for Designer of the Year", and Elle Decors "Elle Decor International Design Award for Bedding".

In 2017, she was inducted into the Entrepreneur Hall of Fame at the Henry W. Bloch School of Management at the University of Missouri, Kansas City.

Also in 2017, she was named one of the Most Creative People in Business by Fast Company.

References

External links
 Frances Valentine
 

1962 births
2018 deaths
American fashion businesspeople
American fashion designers
American people of Irish descent
Artists from Kansas City, Missouri
Arizona State University alumni
Businesspeople from Kansas
Businesspeople from Kansas City, Missouri
2018 suicides
Female suicides
Suicides by hanging in New York City
University of Kansas alumni
Walter Cronkite School of Journalism and Mass Communication alumni
20th-century American businesspeople